Pat George (February 26, 1956) is an American businessman and politician from Kansas.  He is currently the president and CEO of Valley Hope Association in Norton, Kansas.

In 2010, George was elected as the State Representative of the 119th district, and served from 2005 to January 10, 2011. He served under Governor Sam Brownback. Brownback had previously announced his intention to nominate George to serve as commerce secretary.  George's appointment was confirmed by the Kansas Senate on February 3, 2011.  He resigned in July 2015 to work with Valley Hope.

George was a co-owner of the Dodge City Legend professional basketball team. Additionally, he has been a partner in a number of businesses, including the Dodge City Steak Company and G and G Incorporated.

He has his B.A. in psychology from Benedictine College.

Committee membership
As a Kansas State Representative, George served on the following committees prior to his appointment as secretary:
 Taxation
 Vision 2020 (Vice-Chair)
 Veterans, Military and Homeland Security
 Economic Development and Tourism
 Joint Committee on Economic Development

Major donors
The top 5 donors to George's 2008 campaign:
1. Kansas Contractors Assoc 	$1,000
2. Kansas Assoc of Insurance Agents 	$600
3. Ruffin, Phil 	$500 	
4. Carr, M E 	$500 	
5. Kansas Beer Wholesalers Assoc 	$500

References

External links
 Official Website
 Kansas Legislature - Pat George
 Project Vote Smart profile
 Kansas Votes profile
 State Surge - Legislative and voting track record
 Campaign contributions: 2004, 2006, 2008

State cabinet secretaries of Kansas
Republican Party members of the Kansas House of Representatives
Living people
1956 births
Benedictine College alumni
People from Dodge City, Kansas
People from Norton, Kansas
21st-century American politicians